Malo Bavanište is a village in Serbia. It is situated in the Kovin municipality, South Banat District, Vojvodina province. The village has a Serb ethnic majority (94.28%) and its population numbering 420 people (2002 census).

Historical population

1961: 422
1971: 694
1981: 621
1991: 522
2002: 420

See also
List of places in Serbia
List of cities, towns and villages in Vojvodina

References
Slobodan Ćurčić, Broj stanovnika Vojvodine, Novi Sad, 1996.

External links
Municipalities of Vojvodina

Populated places in Serbian Banat
Populated places in South Banat District
Kovin